Sander Gillé (born 15 January 1991) is a Belgian tennis player.

Gillé has a career-high doubles ranking of World No. 24 by the ATP, achieved on 8 November 2021. He also has a career-high singles ranking of World No. 574, reached on 24 December 2018.

Career

2019: Three ATP doubles titles
Gillé won his first ATP Tour doubles title at the 2019 Swedish Open with fellow Belgian Joran Vliegen. A week later, they won their second title at Gstaad. In the next week, their 11-match winning streak was ended in the final of Kitzbühel. Two months later, Gillé and Vliegen picked up their third title of 2019 at the Zhuhai Championships.

2020-2021: Two ATP doubles titles, first Grand Slam quarterfinal, Masters 1000 semifinal, top 25 debut
Gillé won two more titles with his partner Jordan Vliegen at the 2020 Astana Open and at the 2021 Singapore Open.
They also reached the quarterfinals at the 2020 US Open (tennis) losing to the eventual runners-up Mektic/Koolhof, their best showing as a pair at a Grand Slam thus far.
The pair made their first Masters 1000 semifinal at the 2021 Madrid Open, losing to the second-seeded pair of Pavic/Mektic. As a result, Gillé reached a career-high of  33, on 10 May 2021.

ATP career finals

Doubles: 8 (6 titles, 2 runner-ups)

Challenger and Futures finals

Singles: 2 (1–1)

Doubles: 63 (40–23)

Performance timelines

Doubles 
Current through the 2022 Davis Cup.

Mixed doubles
This table is current through the 2022 Australian Open.

Davis Cup

Participations: (1–1)

   indicates the outcome of the Davis Cup match followed by the score, date, place of event, the zonal classification and its phase, and the court surface.

References

External links
 
 
 
 
 
 

1991 births
Living people
Belgian male tennis players
Olympic tennis players of Belgium
Sportspeople from Hasselt
East Tennessee State University alumni
Tennis players at the 2020 Summer Olympics
20th-century Belgian people
21st-century Belgian people